Pasir Ris East MRT station is a future underground Mass Rapid Transit station on the Cross Island MRT line located in Pasir Ris, Singapore. It will be located along Pasir Ris Drive 1, between Pasir Ris Street 12 and Pasir Ris Street 11.

History
On 25 January 2019, the Land Transport Authority (LTA) announced that Pasir Ris East station would be part of the proposed Cross Island line (CRL). The station will be constructed as part of Phase 1 (CRL1), consisting of 12 stations between Aviation Park and Bright Hill. CRL1 was expected to be completed in 2029. However, the restrictions imposed on construction works due to the COVID-19 pandemic led to delays and the CRL1 completion date was pushed by one year to 2030.

The contract for the design and construction of Pasir Ris East Station and associated tunnels was awarded on 7 February 2022 to a joint venture between Singapore Engineering & Construction Pte. Ltd. and Sinohydro Corporation Limited (Singapore Branch) at S$363 million (US$ million). Construction of the station will start in the second quarter of 2022. The roads and utilities are to be diverted in stages to facilitate construction works.

From 30 October 2022, a section of Pasir Ris Drive 1 between Pasir Ris Drive 2 and Drive 4 will be closed off to facilitate the construction of the station. Bus services plying the affected stretch of the road will be diverted to the adjoining roads of Pasir Ris Street 11 and Street 12.

References

Proposed railway stations in Singapore
Mass Rapid Transit (Singapore) stations
Railway stations scheduled to open in 2030